Fernando Edgar Galetto (born 13 April 1971 in Monte Cristo, Córdoba) is a former Argentine footballer.

Career
He began his career playing for Racing de Córdoba before moving to Talleres at age 21 in 1992. A few months later, he joined Lanús before moving to San Lorenzo de Almagro, where was part of the team that won the 1995 Torneo Clausura. During this time Galetto also made one appearance for the Argentina national team in 1995. In 1999, he joined Panathinaikos, where he played for three years and scored his 2 goals against Olympiacos FC and Deportivo la Coruña. After his return from Greece, he played for Lanús for one season and Racing de Córdoba for another before retiring.

Personal
He is married to María José Galíndez and has three children.

External links 
 Argentine Primera statistics
Fernando Galetto scoring against Olympiakos (video)

1971 births
Living people
Argentina international footballers
Argentine footballers
Argentine expatriate footballers
Racing de Córdoba footballers
Panathinaikos F.C. players
Talleres de Córdoba footballers
San Lorenzo de Almagro footballers
Club Atlético Lanús footballers
Argentine Primera División players
Super League Greece players
Expatriate footballers in Greece
Argentine expatriate sportspeople in Greece
Association football midfielders
Footballers from Córdoba, Argentina